Trubarevo is a village in the municipality of Gazi Baba, North Macedonia.

Demographics
According to the 2021 census, the village had a total of 2.470 inhabitants. Ethnic groups in the village include:

Macedonians 1.772
Albanians 334
Persons for whom data are taken from administrative sources 221
Serbs 85
Turks 8
Romani 4
Bosnians 2
Others 44

References

External links

Villages in Gazi Baba Municipality